is a Japanese politician of the New Komeito Party, a member of the House of Representatives in the Diet (national legislature). A native of Sapporo, Hokkaido and graduate of Fuji Women's University, she was elected to the House of Representatives for the first time in 1996.

References

External links 
 Official website in Japanese. (unlegitimate)

1965 births
Living people
People from Sapporo
Female members of the House of Representatives (Japan)
Members of the House of Representatives (Japan)
New Komeito politicians
21st-century Japanese politicians
21st-century Japanese women politicians
Fuji Women's University alumni